Nick Moloney is an Australian professional yachtsman, born on 5 May 1968 in Melbourne, Australia. Having completed 3 circumnavigation and set 15 speed records and competed in pinnacle yachting events.

Race result highlights

Biography

He began his professional sailing career with two America's Cup campaigns in 1992 and 1995 alongside John Bertrand. At the Louis-Vuitton Cup in San Diego on 5 March 1995 the Australian boat One Australia sank during the fourth round.

He made his first round-the-world trip as a crew member on the American boat Toshiba a Volvo 60 competing in the 1997-98 Whitbread Round the World Race which was project managed by America Cup legend Dennis Conner who also became skipper for the later part of the race.

In 1998, he became the first to windsurfer across the Bass Strait, which lies between mainland Australia and Tasmania in a time of 22 hours.

In 2001, he won the EDS Atlantic Challenge onboard the IMOCA 60, Kingfisher with Ellen MacArthur who skippered for the first three stages before Moloney himself took over skipper responsibilities. He later that year again on Kingfisher finished 3rd in the two person transatlantic race the Transat Jacques-Vabre.

In 2002 he was part of Bruno Peyron crew setting a new none stop round the world sailing record on the maxi catamaran Orange II. The time taken was 64 days 8 hours 37 minutes beating the previous record by more than a week and also claiming the Jules Verne Trophy.

In 2004 he started the 2004–2005 Vendée Globe on the IMOCA 60 called Skandia which previously completed the race under the name Kingfisher with Ellen MacArthur. He struggled with various technical issues culminating on 28 January 2005 having completed the majority of the race his keel fell off and he was forced to retire. He left the boat for repair in Brazil, then came back to pick up the boat several months later and unofficially complete the race course.

In 2020 at the age of 52 he announced he wanted to compete in proposed offshore mixed discipline at the 2024 Summer Olympics for Australia to be held in Marseille and was teaming up with high profile offshore navigator Adrienne Cahalan.

Books

Film director
He directed a documentary Wild Colonial Boy released in Australia on 10 March 2000, which was filmed in Brittany and Gijon, Spain, recounting preparations for a crossing of the Atlantic.

References

External links 
 Official Website

1968 births
Living people
People from Melbourne
Australian male sailors (sport)
IMOCA 60 class sailors
2004 Vendee Globe sailors
Australian Vendee Globe sailors